Qushkhaneh-ye Olya (also Romanized as Qūshkhāneh-ye ‘Olyā) is a village in Chaman Rural District, Takht-e Soleyman District, Tikan təpə County, West Azerbaijan Province, Iran. At the 2006 census, its population was 21, in 5 families.

References 

Populated places in Takab County